is a Japanese footballer currently playing as a midfielder for Kyoto Sanga.

Career statistics

Club
.

Notes

References

External links

2001 births
Living people
Japanese footballers
Japan youth international footballers
Association football midfielders
J2 League players
Ventforet Kofu players
Kyoto Sanga FC players